Stanwick Hall may refer to: 
Stanwick Park in Yorkshire, a demolished country house
Stanwick Hall, Northamptonshire a Georgian mansion house

Architectural disambiguation pages